Cook Bay is the name of three bays:

Cook Bay (South Georgia), in the subantarctic island of South Georgia
Cook Bay (Antarctica), on the George V Coast
Cook Bay (Tierra del Fuego), south of Tierra del Fuego

See also 
Cook's Bay (disambiguation)